HR 8442 is a spectroscopic binary star in the constellation Cepheus. The primary is a G type giant star while the secondary's spectral type is unknown.

The spectroscopic binary nature of the star was first noticed by  Jose Renan de Medeiros and Michel Mayor using radial velocity measurements from the Coravel spectrometer at Haute-Provence Observatory. Roger Griffin then placed the star on his observing program at Cambridge Observatory leading to an orbital solution being published in 2015.

References

Cepheus (constellation)
Durchmusterung objects
210220
8442
109190
Spectroscopic binaries
G-type giants